Malevy Leons (born 23 September 1999) is a Dutch college basketball player for the Bradley Braves of the Missouri Valley Conference. 

Born in IJmuiden, he played professionally for Apollo Amsterdam in the Netherlands to start his career. He moved to the United States to play for Mineral Area College where he was the NABC Junior College Player of the Year in his sophomore season.

Early career
Leons played in the youth academy of Apollo Amsterdam. He made his debut for the senior team in the Dutch Basketball League (DBL) during the 2017–18 season. In the following season, Leons became a permanent member of the team and started in 15 games, contributing 5.9 points and 4 rebounds per game for Apollo.

College career
In 2020, Leons moved to the United States to play for the Mineral Area College. He helped the team claim a 20–0 record while winning the Midwest District championship. He led the team with 18.7 points and 9.5 rebounds, while also adding 2 blocks and 3.1 assists per game. Leons was named the Junior College Player of the Year by the National Association of Basketball Coaches (NABC).

Starting from the 2021–22 season, Leons plays for the Bradley Braves in the Missouri Valley Conference (MVC).

Career statistics

Source:

DBL

|-
| 2017–18 || Apollo Amsterdam || 16 || 0 || 11.8 || .431 || .059 || .792 || 2.3 || 0.5 || 0.9 || 0.3 || 4.0
|-
| 2018–19 ||Apollo Amsterdam || 35 || 15 || 18.7 || .405 || .292 || .649 || 4.0 || 0.5 || 0.6 || 0.3 || 5.9
|-
|}

College

|-
| 2019–20 || Mineral Area College || 32 || 31 || 3.6 || .613 || .300 || .877 || 6.6 || 1.9 || 1.7 || 2.1 || 13.1
|-
| 2020–21 || Mineral Area College || 25 || 24 || 8.0 || .564 || .293 || .723 || 9.5 || 3.1 || 1.1 || 2.0 || 18.7
|}

References

External links
ESPN.com profile
RealGM profile

1999 births
Living people
Apollo Amsterdam players
Bradley Braves men's basketball players
Dutch Basketball League players
Dutch expatriate basketball people in the United States
Dutch men's basketball players
Junior college men's basketball players in the United States
Mineral Area College alumni
Power forwards (basketball)